Dual specificity protein phosphatase 22 is an enzyme that in humans is encoded by the DUSP22 gene.

Interactions
DUSP22 has been shown to interact with MAPK1 and MAPK8.

References

Further reading

External links 
 PDBe-KB provides an overview of all the structure information available in the PDB for Human Dual specificity protein phosphatase 22

EC 3.1.3